Kagel Canyon is a rural unincorporated community in Los Angeles County, California.

Geography
The community and canyon are located in the southwestern San Gabriel Mountains foothills within the Angeles National Forest. It is located east above the City of San Fernando, and north above the community of Lakeview Terrace.

The area is above the northeastern San Fernando Valley, and overlooks the western Crescenta Valley.

In 2000, Kagel Canyon and the neighboring Lopez Canyon community had a combined population of 697.

References

External links
Kagel Canyon Civic Association

Unincorporated communities in Los Angeles County, California
San Gabriel Mountains
Angeles National Forest
Communities in the San Fernando Valley
Unincorporated communities in California